Adol Dam is an earthfill dam on Adola river near Borala in Washim district in the state of Maharashtra, India.

Specifications

Purpose
 Irrigation

See also
 Dams in Maharashtra
 List of reservoirs and dams in India

References

Dams in Washim district
Dams completed in 1990
1990 establishments in Maharashtra